Séchault is a commune in the Ardennes department in northern France.

Population

History
On 29 September 1918 the village was captured by the 369th Infantry Regiment.

See also
Communes of the Ardennes department

References

Communes of Ardennes (department)
Ardennes communes articles needing translation from French Wikipedia